Dindri is a village on the island of Anjouan in the Comoros. According to the 1991 Comoros census it had a population of 4,441. The estimated population for 2009 is 7,816.

References

Populated places in Anjouan